Keith Robert Newton (23 June 1941 – 16 June 1998) was an English international footballer who played as a defender in The Football League in the 1960s and 1970s.

Newton was born in Manchester. He started his career with Blackburn Rovers and first played a League game in the 1960–61 season. Newton went on to play over 300 games for the club.

He transferred to Everton in December 1969 and made 12 appearances for them in the latter half of the 1969–70 season, in which Everton won the Football League First Division.

Newton moved to Burnley for the 1972–73 season, making his league debut on 12 August 1972 against Carlisle United. He made a total of 209 league appearances for Burnley, his last coming in the 1977–78 season.

International career 

Newton made his international debut for England against West Germany in February 1966. He went on to play 27 times for England, including three games at the 1970 World Cup Finals, where, through injury, he gained the distinction of becoming the first England player to be substituted at a World Cup, being replaced by Tommy Wright six minutes into the second half of England's opening match against Romania in Guadalajara. Newton also assisted in both England goals in the Quarter-Final defeat to West Germany.

References

1941 births
1998 deaths
Blackburn Rovers F.C. players
Burnley F.C. players
England international footballers
England under-23 international footballers
English footballers
Everton F.C. players
UEFA Euro 1968 players
1970 FIFA World Cup players
Footballers from Manchester
English Football League players
Morecambe F.C. players
Association football fullbacks
English Football League representative players